The Langley Rams (formerly the South Surrey Rams and Big Kahuna Rams) are a Canadian Junior Football team based in Langley, British Columbia. The Rams play in the six-team B.C. Football Conference, which itself is part of the Canadian Junior Football League (CJFL) and competes annually for the national title known as the Canadian Bowl.

History
The Rams were founded in 1948, where they were based in Surrey and known as the Surrey Rams and later the South Surrey Rams when the club briefly relocated to South Surrey. In 2006, the team was renamed the Big Kahuna Rams after a sponsorship deal was signed with Big Kahuna Sport Company. On December 5, 2010, the team was officially introduced as the Langley Rams as the team made the move to Langley to play in McLeod Athletic Park Stadium.

The Rams qualified for the Canadian CJFL Championship against the Saskatoon Hilltops in 2012, which was the team's first appearance in the title game since 1992. However, the Rams lost to the Hilltops by a score of 23–21, giving the Hilltops their third straight Championship. The Rams returned to the championship game in 2014, 2018, and 2019, but lost each time to the perennial powerhouse Hilltops.

In 2021, under the guidance of new head coach, Cory Philpot, the Rams defeated the Hilltops in the national semi-final by a score of 17–14. The Rams then went on to dominate in the Canadian Bowl, defeating the London Beefeaters by a score of 37–0 to win the first national championship in franchise history.

2021 National Championship season

References

External links
Langley Rams homepage
Canadian Junior Football League

Canadian Junior Football League teams
Langley, British Columbia (district municipality)
Canadian football teams in Vancouver
Sports clubs established in 1948
1948 establishments in British Columbia